Documenting Hate is a project of ProPublica, in collaboration with a number of journalistic, academic, and computing organizations, for systematic tracking of hate crimes and bias incidents. It uses an online form to facilitate reporting of incidents by the general public. Since August 2017, it has also used machine learning and natural language processing techniques to monitor and collect news stories about hate crimes and bias incidents. , over 100 news organizations had joined the project.

History

Origin 

Documenting Hate was created in response to ProPublica's dissatisfaction with the quality of reporting and tracking of evidence of hate crimes and bias incidents after the United States presidential election of 2016. The project was launched on 17 January 2017, after the publication on 15 November 2016 of a ProPublica news story about the difficulty of obtaining hard data on hate crimes.

Introduction of the Documenting Hate News Index 

On 18 August 2017, ProPublica and Google announced the creation of the Documenting Hate News Index, which uses the Google Cloud Natural Language API for automated monitoring and collection of news stories about hate crimes and bias incidents. The API uses machine learning and natural language processing techniques. The findings of the Index are integrated with reports from members of the public. The Index is a joint project of ProPublica, Google News Lab, and the data visualization studio Pitch Interactive.

Response

Participation 

, thousands of incidents had been reported via Documenting Hate. , over 100 news organizations had joined the project, including the Boston Globe, the New York Times, Vox, and the Georgetown University Hoya.

Relationship to government statistical monitoring 

A policy analyst for the Center for Data Innovation (an affiliate of the Information Technology and Innovation Foundation), while supporting ProPublica's critique of the present state of hate-crime statistics, and praising ProPublica for drawing attention to the problem, has argued that a nongovernmental project like Documenting Hate cannot solve it unaided; instead, intervention at the federal level is needed.

See also 

 Unite the Right rally

References

External links 
 Documenting Hate on ProPublica (www.documentinghate.com redirects to this ProPublica page)
 Documenting Hate News Index
 Google News Lab
 Google Cloud Natural Language API
 Pitch Interactive

Data mining
Data journalism
Hate crime
Knowledge bases
Applications of artificial intelligence
Media analysis organizations and websites
Natural language processing
Social statistics